Helena is a hamlet in the Town of Brasher in St. Lawrence County, New York, United States.

Helena was the name of the daughter of Joseph Pitcairn. It is also known as "Ohi'karónthne", a Mohawk name which translates to "at the place of the thorn bush".

Infrastructure
A new bridge finished construction in November 2021

History

Map Coordinates

References

Hamlets in New York (state)
Hamlets in St. Lawrence County, New York